Jannis Heuer (born 29 July 1999) is a German professional footballer who plays as a defender for SC Paderborn in the .

Career
Heuer was born in Burgwedel. After playing youth football for Hannover 96, he switched to VfL Wolfsburg in 2014. He made his senior debut for VfL Wolfsburg II on 9 December 2018 in a 6–1 win over Eintracht Norderstedt. In total, he scored four goals in 24 appearances for Wolfsburg II. He joined SC Paderborn on a two-year contract in July 2021. He made his debut for SC Paderborn on 24 July 2021 when he was named in the starting eleven for a 0–0 2. Bundesliga draw with 1. FC Heidenheim.

References

External links

1999 births
Living people
German footballers
Association football defenders
Hannover 96 players
VfL Wolfsburg II players
SC Paderborn 07 players
2. Bundesliga players
Regionalliga players